Gary E. Liebl is an American business leader, founding chairman of the board (ret.), QLogic, chairman emeritus at Chaminade University of Honolulu.

References
 http://articles.latimes.com/1990-10-01/business/fi-1212_1_board-members
 https://web.archive.org/web/20110927225720/http://www.midweek.com/content/columns/movers_article/business_leaders_on_the_move_in_hawaii37/
 http://www.marianist.com/fol/fol71.htm 

Living people
American businesspeople
Loyola Marymount University alumni
Year of birth missing (living people)
Place of birth missing (living people)